Green Gems International School is an English language middle school located in Dhanmondi, Dhaka, Bangladesh. It follows the overseas syllabus of the University of London, allowing its students to sit for GCSE, O Level and A Level examinations. The school has its own science laboratory and computer rooms.

References

Schools in Dhaka District